Travis Andrew Morin (born January 9, 1984) is an American former professional ice hockey player who briefly played in the National Hockey League (NHL) with the Dallas Stars. He most notably played with the Stars American Hockey League (AHL) affiliate, the Texas Stars, appearing in 686 games across ten seasons and having his jersey retired after he finished his playing career in 2019.

Playing career
Born in Brooklyn Park, Minnesota, Morin was named Metro player of the year by the Minneapolis Star Tribune in 2002, his senior year at Osseo Senior High School. During that season he also scored 66 points to pass former NHL player Trent Klatt to become the all-time point leader at Osseo. He was selected by the Washington Capitals in the 9th round, 263rd overall, in the 2004 NHL Entry Draft, while at Minnesota State University, Mankato.

In the 2008–09 season, Morin led the South Carolina Stingrays of the ECHL in points, with 88 in 71 games. He also led in assists with 63. He had 22 points in the playoffs, in which the Stingrays won their third Kelly Cup.

After spending the 2009–10 season helping lead the Texas Stars to the Calder Cup finals in their inaugural season, Morin was signed by NHL affiliate Dallas Stars to a one-year contract on July 12, 2010. Morin made his NHL Debut with the Stars during the 2010–11 season in a 3-1 victory over the Edmonton Oilers on January 26, 2011.  Morin played almost all of his professional career for the Texas Stars, though he saw limited action with Dallas in 2013-2014, gaining his only NHL point (an assist) during that time.

Morin again led the Texas Stars to the Calder Cup finals in 2014; the Stars would win the Calder Cup and Morin was awarded the Jack A. Butterfield Trophy as the Most Valuable Player during the Cup finals.

On May 19, 2017, as an impending free agent, Morin opted to continue his tenure with Texas, signing a one-year AHL contract.

After his 12th year in professional hockey, and 10th with Texas, Morin announced his retirement from playing on July 31, 2019, accepting a position within the Texas Stars as both a skills development coach in hockey operations and in a business development and community outreach role in the front office.

He finished his career as the Texas Stars leader in games played, goals, assists and points and was announced to be the first player to have his number retired by Texas during the 2019–20 season on October 19, 2019.

Personal
Morin has two brothers, Mick and Matt Morin. He and his wife, Lindsey, have three sons, Andrew, Lucas and Bradley.

Career statistics

Awards and honors

References

External links 

1984 births
Living people
Chicago Steel players
Dallas Stars players
Hershey Bears players
Minnesota State Mavericks men's ice hockey players
People from Brooklyn Park, Minnesota
South Carolina Stingrays players
Texas Stars players
Washington Capitals draft picks
American men's ice hockey centers
Minnesota State University, Mankato alumni